Procambarus nueces, sometimes called the Nueces crayfish, is a species of crayfish in the family Cambaridae. It is endemic to the Atascosa River in Atascosa County, Texas. It was described from four individuals, and only two further individuals have been found since.

References

Cambaridae
Freshwater crustaceans of North America
Endemic fauna of Texas
Taxonomy articles created by Polbot
Crustaceans described in 1995
Taxa named by Horton H. Hobbs Jr.